This is a list of the extreme points of Romania, the points that are farther north, south, east or west than any other location.

Latitude and longitude
Northernmost point: Horodiștea, a village in Botoșani County, on the border with Moldova, 
Historical: Babin, Cernăuți County (now Babyn, Chernivtsi Oblast, Ukraine)
Southernmost point: Zimnicea, a town in Teleorman County, on the border with Bulgaria, 
Historical: Ecrene, Caliacra County (now Kranevo, Dobrich Province, Bulgaria)
Westernmost point: Beba Veche, a village in Timiș County, on the border with Hungary and Serbia, 
Easternmost point: Sulina, a town in Tulcea County, on the Danube Delta, . Also the easternmost point in the contiguous EU (22 states).
Historical: Bugaz, Cetatea Albă County (now Zatoka, Odessa Oblast, Ukraine)

Height
 Highest Point: Moldoveanu Peak, in the Făgăraș Mountains, (2,544 m), 
 Lowest Point: Black Sea shore

See also 

 Geography of Romania
 Extreme points of Europe
 Extreme points of the European Union

Lists of coordinates
 
Extreme